Christopher Six (born 12 December 1985) is a French equestrian. He competed in the individual eventing at the 2020 Summer Olympics.

References

External links
 

1985 births
Living people
French male equestrians
Olympic equestrians of France
Equestrians at the 2020 Summer Olympics
Sportspeople from Essonne
Event riders
Medalists at the 2020 Summer Olympics
Olympic bronze medalists for France
Olympic medalists in equestrian
21st-century French people